Livets ax (lit. Ear of Life) is a 1991 novel by Swedish author Sven Delblanc. It won the August Prize in 1991.

References

1991 Swedish novels
Swedish-language novels
August Prize-winning works
Albert Bonniers Förlag books